Thelymitra aggericola, commonly called the bleak sun orchid, is a species of orchid that is endemic to Tasmania. It has a single long, curved leaf and up to seven or more white to pale blue flowers, green on their back side.

Description
The lobe on the top of the anther is pale yellow to light brown, sharply curved with an inflated hood. The side lobes have dense, mop-like tufts of white hairs. Flowering occurs in October and November.

Taxonomy and naming
Thelymitra aggericola was first formally described in 1999 by David Jones from a specimen collected near Temma south of Arthur River and the description was published in The Orchadian. The specific epithet (aggericola) is derived from the Latin agger meaning "heap" or "mound" and -cola meaning "dweller".

Distribution and habitat
The bleak sun orchid usually grows in rock crevices and shallow soil pockets close to the coast in the north-west and south-east of Tasmania. The plants open freely on warm to hot days and many seed capsules are produced, suggesting that the flowers are capable of self pollination.

References

External links
 

aggericola
Endemic orchids of Australia
Orchids of Tasmania
Plants described in 1999